Ježdovec is a village in Central Croatia, located west of Zagreb. It is part of the City of Zagreb. As of 2011, the population was 1,728. Lučko Airport, named after the nearby suburb Lučko, is located at the southern outskirts of Ježdovec.

References

Populated places in the City of Zagreb